Steve Reyes (Born:1948) is an American photographer and storyteller from Oakland, California. Reyes has been included in Don Garlits' International Drag Racing Hall of Fame (2002), NHRA California Hot Rod Reunion Honorees (2009), and the East Coast Drag Times Hall of Fame (2011).     

Reyes' photography career has primarily focused on automotive sports, but he has also photographed Major League Baseball, National Hockey League, skateboarding and CB radios. He has authored nine automotive photography books which cover his nearly 50-year career.   

Reyes is currently retired.  He continues to write books and online articles from his home in Florida.

Career

Automotive (1963–2008) 
Reyes attended his first race at Fremont Dragstrip in 1963 where his dad convinced the track manager that he was old enough to be up on the line filming with his 8mm movie camera and Kodak 620 Brownie.  At the age of fifteen became the track photographer after shooting photos from the grandstands. He would hitchhike with racers to attend races on the West Coast or stencil the letters on driver's cars for rides. Doris Herbert, who owned Drag News, would frequently ask Reyes to cover events since he would get the photos to her quickly.  During weekend events, he would take photos on Saturday, develop them in a portable darkroom in his motel, and then sell the photos to racers on Sunday so that they could see how their cars were leaving the line.  Reyes' first major publication came in 1966, when his photos were picked up by Mike Doherty's Drag Racing Almanac.  The following year, he had more photos featured than any other racing photographer on the circuit.  You have to remember that in those days, there were no guardrails or concrete walls.  It was just man and machine and with the hopped-up nitro missiles blowing up or launching into uncontrollable wheel stands on a regular basis, it took considerable courage to stand your ground in order to get the best angles.  Reyes became NHRA's Pacific (Division 7) photographer in 1969, primarily freelancing for the next four years. In 1970, he moved from Oakland to Los Angeles to be closer to his clients and within three years became the photographic editor for 12-plus magazine titles for Argus Publishing Corp (1973-1994). During his time at Argus, Reyes supplied 70% of the cover photography and 85% of the inside color photography for titles such as Popular Hot Rodding, Super Chevy, and 1001 Custom and Rod Ideas. He also covered NHRA, AHRA, and IHRA races, in addition to World of Outlaws, street rod events, sprint cars, monster trucks, motorbikes, mud racing, and sand racing.  

Reyes is responsible for many iconic photographs of drag racing and stunt driver legends, including Raymond Beadle, Gene Snow, Tony Nancy Wedge, Jeb Allen, Tom McEwen (drag racer), Don Garlits, Bob Glidden, Joe Amato, Don Prudhomme, Shirley Muldowney, and Jim Liberman.  Reyes' photos of Evel Knievel's 1974 jump at Snake River Canyon were displayed as part of a special exhibit at the Smithsonian Institution.    

Over his career, Reyes was responsible for over 300 magazine covers. During one month in 1973, Reyes shot 7 of 11 covers of car magazines on the newsstand. Reyes has photographed races in all 50 US States, Canada, Great Britain, Australia, New Zealand, and Japan. He has covered events in over 109 dragstrips worldwide, including the last drag race ever held at Lions Dragstrip.  While primarily noted for his action shots and crashes at the races, he also has an extensive collection of doorslammers run by local drivers.  Reyes utilized a variety of locations for formal shoots, including Lion Country Safari, Long Beach Harbor, fast-food locations, Saguaro National Park, Six Flags, the National Mall, and El Centro

Reyes' photographs have been featured extensively in magazines, books, movies, and as the artwork for ACME Diecast., Mattel, MPC, Playing Mantis / Johnny Lightning, and Revell die cast and model car kits

Baseball (1981–1985) 
In 1981, Reyes was given an assignment through his job at Argus Publishing Corp. to shoot the car collection of Reggie Jackson from the New York Yankees.  Through Jackson's influence, Reyes was given access to many Major League Baseball franchises, and would shoot weekday games. He was the only photographer who had shot all 117 of Jackson's cars. Reyes has photographs included at the Pro Baseball Hall of Fame in Cooperstown, New York.

Hockey (1991–1995) 
During the early 1990s, Reyes photographed several hockey teams for NY's Bruce Bennett Studios, including the Los Angeles Kings, the Mighty Ducks of Anaheim and the Peoria Rivermen. Notable players included Wayne Gretzky, Brendan Shanahan, and Curtis Joseph.

Bibliography

Author 

 Fabulous Funny Cars: A Pictorial History of the World's Fastest Automobiles (1994)
 Quarter Mile Chaos: Images of Drag Racing Mayhem (2006)
 Funny Car Fever: The Birth of Drag Racing's Wildest Class (2007)
 Slingshot Spectacular: The Front-Engine Dragster Era (2007)
 Fuel Altereds Forever (2008)
 Blood, Sweat, and Nitro (2010)
 Funny Car Follies (2010)
 The Dawn of ProStock: Drag Racing's Fastest Doorslammers (2013)
 Top Fuel Dragsters: Drag Racing's Rear Engine Revolution (2016)

Magazines
Unless otherwise noted, all magazines references are listed here. 

1001 Truck and Van Ideas
All American Drags
Car Craft
Cars
Drag Digest
Drag News
Drag Racing Almanac
Drag Racing USA
Drag Strip
Drag World
Esquire
Gasser Wars
Hemmings Muscle Car
Hot Rod
Hot Rodding in Action
National Dragster
Off Road
Penthouse
Popular Cycling
Popular Hot Rodding
Super Chevy
Super Stock
Vintage Motorsports

Cover photos 

 Focus on Sports:Photographing Action (1975)
Petersen's History of Drag Racing (1981)
Big-Block Chevy Performance (1995)
Spirit Engine (2008)
Six Seconds to Glory (2013)

Other contributions 

 1966 Drag Racing Almanac (1966)
The Sox & Martin book of drag racing (1974)
High performance : the culture and technology of drag racing, 1950-1990 (1994)
The Race Car Chassis (1997)
Stories of triumph: women who win in sport and in life (1998)
Nor Cal Fuelers 1960's Video Scrapbook #1 (2006)
Superfast cars (2006)
Fuel & Guts (2007)
Drag Racers (2008)
Drag Racing's Exhibition Attractions (2008)
Hurricane! (2008)
Snake vs. Mongoose (2009)
Hot Hot Rods (2011)
The Tasca Ford Legacy (2014)
Lost Drag Strips II (2016)
"Dyno" Don (2018)
Stardust International Raceway (2018)
The American Speed Shop (2019)
Chevy Drag Racing 1955-1980 (2020)

References

External links 
 Steve Reyes Personal Website
 Competition Plus Interview with Steve Reyes
 Getty Images (Hockey)

1948 births
Living people